Wojciech Gumiński (born 10 February 1989) is a Polish handball player for KS Azoty-Puławy and the Polish national team.

References

1989 births
Living people
Sportspeople from Gorzów Wielkopolski
Polish male handball players
21st-century Polish people